Amber-Keegan Stobbs (born 21 October 1992) is an English professional footballer who plays as a forward for Lewes in the FA Women's Championship.

Playing career

Youth and college
Stobbs started playing football at age six. After attending Warlingham School she joined Arsenal Women before moving on to Chelsea Ladies while in school. In 2010, she traveled to the United States and enrolled at Hofstra University, playing football for the Hofstra Pride for five seasons. During her time at university, she registered 66 appearances, scoring nine goals, and thirteen assists.

Washington Spirit
During her time at Hofstra, Stobbs previously played for Washington Spirit Reserves in the American USL W-League where she helped the team win the national championship in 2015.

Senior Club

Reading
In December 2015, Stobbs signed with Reading F.C. of the FA WSL 1. Reading would struggle during the 2016 season, with Stobbs earning 8 appearances.

Everton
In February 2017, Stobbs signed with Everton who were competing in the FA WSL 2 ahead of the FA WSL Spring Series. Later that month, she made her debut for the Toffees in the 8–1 win over Brighouse Town in the FA Women's Cup. Everton would go on to win the Spring Series, with Stobbs registering five appearances.

West Ham United
Ahead of the 2017–18 season, Stobbs joined West Ham United competing in the FA Women's Premier League Southern Division.

Watford
Stobbs made twenty appearances for Watford.

Lewes
She joined Lewes FC in July 2022.

Personal life 
Stobbs is a qualified FA coach and has worked as the women and girls officer at the West Ham Foundation. She is now the director of Equal Focus Football, which works with and develops girls' football and opportunities within local neighbourhoods and supports equity in sport.

Stobbs has two degrees from Hofstra University, a Bachelor's in Psychology and a Masters in Sports Science.

References

External links
 Charlton Athletic player profile 
 Reading player profile 
 Hofstra player profile
 Washington Spirit Reserves player profile
 

Living people
English women's footballers
Women's association football midfielders
Women's Super League players
Reading F.C. Women players
1992 births
Everton F.C. (women) players
West Ham United F.C. Women players
Charlton Athletic W.F.C. players
Hofstra Pride women's soccer players
Expatriate women's soccer players in the United States
English expatriates in the United States
USL W-League (1995–2015) players
Watford F.C. Women players
Women's Championship (England) players